University Stadium or Kerala University Stadium is a multi-purpose stadium located in the city of Thiruvananthapuram, Kerala and is used for predominantly football and also for athletics. University stadium had hosted the first one-day international cricket match in kerala.

The stadium is owned by the University of Kerala  and was opened by Sir Mirza the Diwan of the erstwhile princely state of Hyderabad in 1940. The stadium has a capacity of 20,000.  The G. V. Raja Pavilion is in the stadium. The stadium was used as the home ground for the Indian domestic cricket team Kerala till the late 1980s. The stadium has hosted 2 ODI matches with the host team India losing one match and the other match yielded no result.

The stadium was the home ground of Chirag United Club, for the 2011-2012 I-League season.

One Day International cricket

The stadium has hosted following ODI matches till date.

List of Centuries

Key
 * denotes that the batsman was not out.
 Inns. denotes the number of the innings in the match.
 Balls denotes the number of balls faced in an innings.
 NR denotes that the number of balls was not recorded.
 Parentheses next to the player's score denotes his century number at Edgbaston.
 The column title Date refers to the date the match started.
 The column title Result refers to the player's team result

One Day Internationals

References

External links
 Cricinfo Website - Ground Page
 cricketarchive Website - Ground Page
 Facebook

Cricket grounds in Kerala
Sports venues in Thiruvananthapuram
Chirag United Club Kerala
Football venues in Kerala
University sports venues in India
1940 establishments in India
Sports venues completed in 1940
20th-century architecture in India